Sándor Csányi may refer to:

 Sándor Csányi (actor), Hungarian actor
 Sándor Csányi (banker), Hungarian business executive and banker